"Elena" was the debut single for the West Coast rock group, Marc Tanner Band. It was a hot 100 hit for them in 1979.

Background
The song was written by Marc Tanner, Nat Jeffrey, and Jeff Monday. Nat Jeffrey also produced the single. It was released on the Elektra label, cat# E-46003 in January 1979. Two of the features in the song described by Billboard were the wailing sax solo and the sassy vocals. The single was taken from the group's No Escape album, released on Elektra 6E-168.

Chart performance
As reported for the week ending April 7, 1979, "Elena" moved up to No. 45 on the Billboard Hot 100. It spent six weeks on the chart.

References

1979 debut singles
Elektra Records singles
1979 songs
American pop songs
Songs written by Marc Tanner